Bryce Gibbs may refer to:

 Bryce Gibbs (Australian rules footballer) (born 1989)
 Bryce Gibbs (rugby league) (born 1984), Australian rugby league footballer